The Midland Great Western Railway (MGWR) Class 9 consisted of four engines built by Thomas Grendon and Company of Drogheda in the period 1855-1856.

The MGWR Class 9 was the first 0-6-0 type on the MGWR.  It has   driving wheels.  They were ordered by Edward Wilson during his short tenure as Locomotive Superintendent from 1853.  It is speculated Wilson had little to do with the design, especially as Robert Stephenson and Company had subcontracted an 0-6-0 build to Grendons at this time.

The 0-6-0 three driving axle design has 6 driving wheels against the rail as opposed to the 2-4-0 or 4-2-0 which have two axles and 4 driving wheels. The difficulty lies in a coupling rod over more than 2 axles is more complex to allow for vertical motion. The next two Locomotive Superintendents, Joseph Cabry and Robert Ramage, remained with the 2-4-0, 4-2-0 and even 2-2-2 one or two driving axles designs. It was not until Martin Atock became Locomotive Superintendent in 1872 that further 0-6-0 locomotives were ordered with MGWR Class L four years later.

Grendons supplied two similar engines to the Dundalk and Enniskillen Railway at about the same time.

References 

0-6-0 locomotives
5 ft 3 in gauge locomotives
Railway locomotives introduced in 1855
09
Thomas Grendon and Company locomotives
Scrapped locomotives
Steam locomotives of Ireland